Thomas Dekker (born 6 September 1984) is a Dutch former professional road racing cyclist. His career highlights included winning Tirreno–Adriatico in 2006 and Tour de Romandie in 2007. He won two Dutch National Time Trial Championships and represented his country at the 2004 Summer Olympics held in Athens, Greece.

A few days before the start of the 2009 Tour de France, it was announced that Dekker had tested positive for EPO in a retroactive test carried out on a urine sample taken in December 2007. Dekker initially protested his innocence but he later admitted to using EPO, claiming it was a one-time mistake. He eventually admitted to using EPO over at least parts of the 2007 and 2008 seasons, although he declined to give exact dates. Dekker was suspended for two years, from 1 July 2009 to 30 June 2011.

Dekker's career has been marked by other doping allegations. He was a client of Luigi Cecchini, an Italian doctor who was investigated in relation to doping matters, though Dekker adamantly denies that Cecchini was involved in his doping. In 2009 he was also questioned in the Humanplasma doping scandal, a suspected doping ring connected to Austrian manager Stefan Matschiner. Dekker retired in March 2015 after narrowly failing to set a new world hour record.

Career

Early years
Dekker was born and raised in Dirkshorn, North Holland, Netherlands. He was nicknamed "The hulk from Dirkshorn" and joined the Rabobank junior team in 2002, winning the Junior National time trial championships, among other races. He also finished third in the Men's under-23 road race of the 2003 UCI Road World Championships.

In 2004 he won the Tour de Normandie, Olympia's Tour, the Dutch National Time Trial Championships and also participated in the 2004 Summer Olympics at the age of 19, finishing 21st in the individual time trial. Later in the season he also won the Grand Prix Eddy Merckx with Koen de Kort but crashed out of the Tour de l'Avenir while he was leading the race. In September he joined the  UCI ProTeam for the rest of the 2004 season as a stagiaire. He won a stage of Rheinland-Pfalz Rundfahrt, finished second in both the U23 individual time trial and U23 road race of 2004 UCI Road World Championships and finished first in the UCI U23 Classification of 2004.

Rabobank

In his first season as a professional he won Grote Prijs Stad Zottegem and stages of Critérium International and Tour de Pologne. He also repeated his victory in the Dutch National Time Trial Championships and rode the Giro d'Italia.

In 2006 Dekker won the Tirreno–Adriatico stage race, making him the third Dutch cyclist to win the event, after Joop Zoetemelk (1985) and Erik Dekker (2002) and in 2007 the Tour de Romandie stage race, which featured two time trials and several difficult climbing stages in the Alps and Jura.

In 2007, Dekker debuted in the Tour de France. Although he had been dreaming of winning the young rider classification, he did not win it. He eventually reached the 35th place in the overall final standings, and sixth in the young rider classification,  in the Tour. Dekker finished his 2007 season with his first top ten finish in a 'Classic,' the 2007 Giro di Lombardia.

The 2008 season got off to a promising start, with Dekker coming in 3rd place overall in both the Vuelta a Castilla y León and Tour of the Basque Country and achieving three top-ten finishes in the Ardennes classics. However, after a poor showing in the Tour de Suisse Dekker was not selected by Rabobank for its 2008 Tour de France line-up.

On 14 August 2008 Dekker officially announced on his web page that he had split from Rabobank. Although an early report in SportWereld said Dekker was on the verge of signing with Garmin-Chipotle, team manager Jonathan Vaughters later denied this rumor. Dekker later revealed in an interview and in his book Schoon Genoeg that Vaughters had been on the verge of signing him, but the deal fell through when Dekker's blood values indicated he'd been doping. According to Dekker, this was the wake-up call he needed to quit using performance-enhancing drugs.

Silence-Lotto
In 2009, Dekker finished a respectable 16th in the Tour of Switzerland, with a highlight of 3rd place in the second, 39 km long, individual time trial.

On 1 July 2009, it was announced that a re-test of an out-of-competition sample taken in December 2007, while Dekker was with Rabobank, was found to contain the banned substance EPO. Silence–Lotto immediately removed him from their team for the 2009 Tour de France. Once his B-sample confirmed the EPO positive, Silence-Lotto fired Dekker, who admitted doping, apologizing and calling it "a mistake".  The Monaco Cycling Federation, where Dekker held his racing license, announced on 3 March 2010 that Dekker had been suspended for two years, until 1 July 2011. In addition, the UCI stripped Dekker of all of his results from 24 December 2007, the date of his positive. According to UCI, Dekker was singled out as a result of the biological passport programme, prompting the UCI to conduct a detailed review of past doping controls.

Return with Garmin

Dekker returned to racing on 6 July 2011 in the Grote Prijs Stad St. Niklaas, where he finished 70th. On 18 September he won his first race after his comeback. He won the Duo Normand Team Time Trial together with Paris–Roubaix winner Johan Vansummeren.  team manager Jonathan Vaughters challenged the two to beat the time he himself rode in 2001 with Jens Voigt. Dekker and Vansummeren beat the time of Vaughters and Voigt.

On 18 November 2011, Dekker was confirmed as a  rider for the 2012 season. He left the team in November 2014. Dekker subsequently announced that he would focus on an attempt to break the world hour record in the spring of 2015 instead of finding a new team for the road cycling season.

Doping
In a 2013 interview with Dutch daily newspaper NRC Handelsblad, Dekker stated that he started using performance-enhancing drugs when he joined  in 2005. In that team doping (including EPO) had been used since the mid-1990s, and Dekker stated that it was part of the profession: "doping was a way of life". Documents obtained during the Operación Puerto doping case proved that Dekker had been a customer of Eufemiano Fuentes, a well-known sports doctor who had assisted the Kelme team and many cycling professionals with blood doping; Spanish police found bags of Dekker's blood (Dekker was code-named "rider 24" and "Clasicómano Luigi"), and it turned out that he had had at least two transfusions in the spring of 2006, one four days before winning the Tirreno–Adriatico and another before riding the Tour of the Basque Country. In his interview with NRC, he admitted to having used EPO as well.

Career achievements

Major results

2003
 National Under–23 Road Championships
1st  Road race
1st  Time trial
 3rd  Road race, UCI Road World Under–23 Championships
 3rd De Vlaamse Pijl
 7th Overall Ster Elektrotoer
1st Prologue & Stage 2
2004
 1st  Time trial, National Road Championships
 1st  Overall Le Triptyque des Monts et Châteaux
1st Stage 2
 1st  Overall Tour de Normandie
 1st  Overall  Olympia's Tour
 1st Grand Prix Eddy Merckx
 1st Stage 1 Tour de l'Avenir
 UCI Road World Under–23 Championships
2nd  Road race
2nd  Time trial
 3rd Grand Prix Pino Cerami
 4th Overall Volta ao Algarve
2005
 1st  Time trial, National Road Championships
 1st Grote Prijs Stad Zottegem
 2nd Overall Critérium International
1st Stage 2
 3rd Overall Tour de Pologne
1st Stage 7 (ITT)
 4th Overall Eneco Tour
1st  Young rider classification
 6th Overall Tour Méditerranéen
2006
 1st  Overall Tirreno–Adriatico
 9th Overall Eneco Tour
2007
 1st  Overall Tour de Romandie
1st  Points classification
1st Stage 5 (ITT)
 1st  Overall 3-Länder-Tour
1st Stages 2 & 4 (ITT)
 1st Trofeo Pollença
 1st RaboRonde Heerlen
 1st Stage 6 Tour de Suisse
 5th Overall Eneco Tour
 8th Giro di Lombardia
 9th Gran Premio Bruno Beghelli

2008

 3rd Overall Vuelta a Castilla y León
1st  Points classification
 3rd Overall Tour of the Basque Country
 5th Amstel Gold Race
 5th La Flèche Wallonne
 6th Liège–Bastogne–Liège
2009
 4th Overall Tour of Belgium

2011
 1st Duo Normand (with Johan Vansummeren)
 7th Chrono Champenois
2012
 1st Stage 2 (TTT) Tour of Qatar
 5th Overall Circuit de la Sarthe
1st Stage 5
2013
 8th Overall Ster ZLM Toer
2014
 5th Overall Ster ZLM Toer

Grand Tour general classification results timeline

See also
 List of Dutch Olympic cyclists

References

External links

Palmares at Cycling Base (French)

1984 births
Living people
Cyclists at the 2004 Summer Olympics
Doping cases in cycling
Dutch male cyclists
Dutch sportspeople in doping cases
Olympic cyclists of the Netherlands
People from Harenkarspel
Cyclists from North Holland
Tour de Suisse stage winners
Dutch cycling time trial champions
UCI Road World Championships cyclists for the Netherlands